Jung Ji-yoon is a South Korean actress. She is known for her roles in dramas such as Triangle, Dr. Ian and Vincenzo. She also appeared in movies Confession, Traffickers and The Con Artists.

Filmography

Television series

Film

Awards and nominations
 2012 Blue Dragon Film Awards nominated for Best New Actress in Traffickers

References

External links
 
 

1984 births
Living people
21st-century South Korean actresses
South Korean female models
South Korean television actresses
South Korean film actresses
South Korean web series actresses